Yellow rose may refer to:

Botany
 A yellow rose in general
 Rosa 'Harison's Yellow' or The Yellow Rose of Texas, a rose cultivar
Various rose species with yellow flowers, including:
 Rosa banksiae or Banks' rose
 Rosa foetida or Persian yellow rose
 Rosa hemisphaerica or sulphur rose
 Rosa persica
 Rosa xanthina or Manchu rose

Other uses
 The Yellow Rose, an American TV series, 1983–1984
 "The Yellow Rose" (song), its 1984 theme song, recorded by Johnny Lee and Lane Brody
 The Yellow Rose (film), a 1982 Romanian film
 "Yellow Roses", 1989 song by Dolly Parton
 Yellow Rose (society), a Swedish Masonic adoption lodge, 1802–1803
 Yellow Rose (film), a 2019 musical film directed by Diane Paragas

See also 
 The Yellow Rose of Texas (disambiguation)
 "Who Made Yellow Roses Yellow?", 1959 short story by novelist John Updike
 18 Yellow Roses, 1963 album by American singer Bobby Darin